Antonio Rinaldi was an Italian cinematographer and camera operator.  He worked exclusively for director Mario Bava on several films, including Planet of the Vampires (1965), Dr. Goldfoot and the Girl Bombs (1966), and Danger: Diabolik (1968).

Filmography 

 Planet of the Vampires (1965)
 Knives of the Avenger (1966)
 Kill, Baby, Kill! (1966)
 Dr. Goldfoot and the Girl Bombs (1966)
 Danger: Diabolik (1968)
 Five Dolls for an August Moon (1970)
 Roy Colt and Winchester Jack (1970)
 Four Times That Night (1971)
 Baron Blood (1972)

External links
 

Italian cinematographers
Possibly living people
Year of birth missing
Place of birth missing